Schofields can refer to
Schofields (department store), a defunct department store in Leeds, England
Schofields, New South Wales, a suburb of Sydney, New South Wales, Australia
RAAF Station Schofields, a former Royal Australian Air Force (RAAF) military air base

See also
Schofield (disambiguation)